was a  after Genki and before Bunroku. This period spanned the years from July 1573 through December 1592.

Change of era
 1573 :  The new era name was created to mark a number of regional wars. The era name was inspired by a passage from the Chinese classic Laozi:  :"Those who are at peace with nature bring all under Heaven into its correct pattern" (清静者為天下正).
The era name Tenshō was suggested by Oda Nobunaga. The previous era ended and a new one commenced in Genki 4, the 28th day of the 7th month.

Events of the Tenshō era
European dates up to October 4, 1582 are given in the Julian calendar. Dates since October 15, 1582 are given in the Gregorian calendar.

 1573 (Tenshō 1, 7th month): Ashikaga Yoshiaki lost his position as shōgun.  He shaved his head, becoming a Buddhist priest. Initially, he took the priestly name Sho-san, but he eventually came to be known as Rei-o In.
 1574 (Tenshō 2, 1st month):  Sectarian rebellion in Echizen Province.
 1574 (Tenshō 2, 9th month):  Suppression of sectarian rebellion in Nagashima.
 1575 (Tenshō 3, 5th month): Takeda Katsuyori led an army into Tōtōmi Province where he lay siege to Nagashino Castle. The Tokugawa defended the castle; and Tokugawa Ieayasu sought assistance from Oda Nobunaga.  In response, Nobunaga and his son Nobutada arrived at Nagashino with a large force.  In the ensuing Battle of Nagashino, the Takeda attackers were forced to retreat.
 1576 (Tenshō 4): Takeda Katsuyori ordered the rebuilding of the Asama Shrine at the base of Mount Fuji in Suruga Province.
 1579 (Tenshō 7, 5th month): Azuchi Sect Debates at Azuchi Castle.
 1579 (Tenshō 7, 6th month): Akechi Mitsuhide makes himself master of Tanba Province.
 1579 (Tenshō 7, 10th month): Oda Nobukatsu launches first Tenshō Iga War, ending with his defeat.
 1580 (Tenshō 8, 11th month):  Kaga sectarian rebellion suppressed.
 1581 (Tenshō 9, 9th month): Oda Nobunaga relaunches the second Tenshō Iga War, ending with victory and Iga under left under Nobukatsu's control.
 1582 (Tenshō 10): Takeda Katsuyori utter defeat by the forces of Oda Nobunaga led to the destruction of Takeda-built structures at the Asama Shrine.
 1582 (Tenshō 10, 3rd month):  Battle of Tenmokuzan.
 1582 (Tenshō 10, 6th month):  Incident at Honnō-ji, Battle of Yamazaki, Council of Kiyosu.
 February 20, 1582 (Tenshō 10, 28th day of the 1st month): A Japanese mission or embassy to Europe (Tenshō Ken'ō Shisetsu) sailed from Nagasaki, and its members would not return until 1590. It headed by Mancio Itō and organized on the initiative of Alessandro Valignano. Although less well-known and less well-documented than Hasekura Tsunenaga's diplomatic mission to the Vatican (known as the "Keichō Embassy") in 1613–1620, this historic diplomatic initiative remains a noteworthy accomplishment.  The mission is sometimes referred to as the "Tenshō Embassy" because it was initiated in the  Tenshō era.  This venture was organized by three daimyōs of Western Japan – Ōmura Sumitada, Ōtomo Sōrin and Arima Harunobu. 
 1583 (Tenshō 11, 4th month): Battle of Shizugatake.
 1584 (Tenshō 12, 4th month): Battle of Komaki and Nagakute.
 August 10, 1585 (Tenshō 13, 15th day of the 7th month):  The Japanese mission to the West (Tenshō Ken'ō Shisetsu) arrived in Lisbon.
 1585 (Tenshō 13, 7th month): Toyotomi Hideyoshi is given the position of  kampaku by Ōgimachi.
 December 17, 1586 (Tenshō 14, 7th day of the 11th month):  Ogimachi gave over the reins of government to his grandson, who would become Emperor Go-Yozei.  There had been no such Imperial since Emperor Go-Hanazono abdicated in Kanshō 5.  The dearth of abdications is attributable to the disturbed state of the country and to the fact that there was neither any dwelling in which an ex-emperor could live nor any excess funds in the treasury to support him.
 1586 (Tenshō 14, 12th month): A marriage is arranged between the youngest sister of Hideyoshi and Tokugawa Ieyasu.
 1586 (Tenshō 14, 12th month): The kampaku, Toyotomi Hideyoshi, was nominated to be Daijō-daijin.
 1586 (Tenshō 14, 12th month): An earthquake strikes the Chubu region, killing 8,000 people.
 1587 (Tenshō 15): Gold or silver coins called Tenshō-tsūhō were minted. The gold coins (Tenshō-ōban) weighed 165 grams; and these oval shaped coins were worth 10 ryō.
 1588 (Tenshō 16, 7th month): Emperor Go-Yōzei visits Toyotomi Hideyoshi's mansion, sword hunt decree
 1590 (Tenshō 18, 7th month):  Hideyoshi led an army to the Kantō where he lay siege to Odawara Castle.  When the fortress fell, Hōjō Ujimasa died and his  brother, Hōjō Ujinao submitted to Hideyoshi's power, thus ending a period of serial internal warfare which had continued uninterrupted since the Ōnin era (1467).
 1592 (Tenshō 20, 4th month): The Imjin War begins with the Siege of Busanjin.
In 1589–1590 (in the 23rd year of the reign of King Seonjo of Joseon), a diplomatic mission led by Hwang Yun-gil was sent to Japan.  The Joseon ambassador was received by Hideyoshi.

In popular culture
The fictional plot of the classic Akira Kurosawa film Seven Samurai takes place in the 15th year of Tenshō.

Notes

References
 Kang, Etsuko Hae-jin. (1997). Diplomacy and Ideology in Japanese-Korean Relations: from the Fifteenth to the Eighteenth Century. Basingstoke, Hampshire; Macmillan. ; 
 Nussbaum, Louis Frédéric and Käthe Roth. (2005). Japan Encyclopedia. Cambridge: Harvard University Press. ; OCLC 48943301
 Ponsonby-Fane, Richard Arthur Brabazon. (1959).  The Imperial House of Japan. Kyoto: Ponsonby Memorial Society. OCLC 194887
 . (1962).   Studies in Shinto and Shrines. Kyoto: Ponsonby Memorial Society. OCLC 3994492
 Rutt, Richard and James Hoare.  (2003). Korea: a Historical and Cultural Dictionary. London: Routledge. 
 Titsingh, Isaac. (1834). Nihon Ōdai Ichiran; ou,  Annales des empereurs du Japon.  Paris: Royal Asiatic Society, Oriental Translation Fund of Great Britain and Ireland. OCLC 5850691

External links
 National Diet Library, "The Japanese Calendar" -- historical overview plus illustrative images from library's collection

Japanese eras
1570s in Japan
1580s in Japan
1590s in Japan